Cheryl Palm is an American agricultural scientist who is Professor of Agricultural and Biological Engineering at the University of Florida. Her research considers tropical land use and ecosystem function, including carbon and nutrient dynamics. She is the former Chair of the International Nitrogen Initiative and is a Fellow of the American Association for the Advancement of Science and the American Society of Agronomists.

Early life and education 
Palm studied zoology at the University of California, Davis. She spent her master's year investigating territories and mating in Vanessa annabella. She moved to North Carolina State University for doctoral research, where she studied nitrogen dynamics in cropping systems in the Peruvian Amazon. From 1991 to 2001, Palm served as principal research scientist of the Kenyan Tropical Soil Biology and Fertility Program.

Research and career 
Palm was Director of Research at the AgCenter and the Millennium Villages Project at Columbia University, where she investigated land use, degradation and ecosystem processes in tropical climates. She has quantified carbon stocks, losses and greenhouse gas emissions following slash-and-burn in humid tropics (e.g. Indonesia, the Congo Basin and the Brazilian Amazon). She explored the nutrient dynamics of soil in Africa, looking to identify new options for soil and land rehabilitation. After receiving the World Food Prize in 2002, Palm established the Sanchez Tropical Agriculture Foundation, which provided financial aid to scientists and farmers looking to end hunger in low and middle income countries.

In 2016, Palm joined the faculty of the University of Florida. She has studied the tradeoffs and synergies between agricultural intensification strategies. She delivered the British Society of Soil Science 2018 Russell Lecture. 

Palm was elected Fellow of the American Association for the Advancement of Science in 2022.

Selected publications

Personal life 
Palm is married to Cuban soil scientist Pedro Sanchez.

References 

Year of birth missing (living people)
Living people
American agriculturalists
20th-century American scientists
20th-century American women scientists
21st-century American scientists
21st-century American women scientists
University of California, Davis alumni
North Carolina State University alumni
Columbia University faculty
University of Florida faculty
Fellows of the American Association for the Advancement of Science